Dongyanshan Forest Recreation Area is a forest located in Fuxing District, Taoyuan City, Taiwan.

History
The forest used to be the logging storage area for the Forestry Bureau.

Geology
The forest spans over an area of 916 hectares and located at an altitude of 650–1,212 meters above sea level. It is also home to 43 species of mountain birds and mammals. It features trekking paths with information boards.

See also
 Geography of Taiwan

References

Geography of Taoyuan City
National forest recreation areas in Taiwan
Tourist attractions in Taoyuan City